Digital Rights Ireland is a digital rights advocacy and lobbying group based in Ireland. The group works for civil liberties in a digital age.

Telecommunications data retention 
In 2012, the group brought an action before the Irish High Court, which subsequently made a reference to the Court of Justice of the European Union to take legal action over telecommunications data retention provided for by the Criminal Justice (Terrorist Offences) Act of 2005.

Digital Rights Ireland argues that the act led to Gardaí accessing retained data without having a specific crime to investigate, citing remarks by the Data Protection Commissioner.

On 8 April 2014, the Court of Justice of the European Union declared the Directive invalid in response to a case brought by Digital Rights Ireland against the Irish authorities and others.

File sharing 
The Irish Recorded Music Association has sent letters to people it accuses of file sharing their music, demanding damages for financial losses. One issue is how the files belonging to the alleged file-sharers were searched. MediaSentry software was used to search their machines, but as it doesn't limit itself to searching only folders used for file sharing, this led to questions of violation of privacy. MediaSentry itself is based in the United States, which has less legislation about data protection than the European Union. This has been an issue in cases in the Netherlands and France.

Another issue is Internet service providers being compelled to identify users.

Current action still causes concern to DRI.

Former TD Dr. Jerry Cowley has requested that the complaints referee investigate whether his telephone is being tapped. DRI expressed concern, noting that there is no Irish equivalent of the Wilson Doctrine in Irish law. Fine Gael has also shown concern at the number of telephone taps authorised by former Minister for Justice Michael McDowell. DRI said that the reasons for withholding the information was unacceptable.

Other areas of work 
Other issues addressed by the group include:

ID cards
Electronic passports
Online defamation
Leaking of confidential information by civil servants

See also 
Internet censorship in the Republic of Ireland
Digital rights

References

External links
Digital Rights Ireland official website
Dáil debate on Criminal Justice (Terrorist Offences) Act, 2005 (Also available in Acrobat format.)

Internet privacy organizations
Politics and technology
Internet-related activism
Computer law organizations
Intellectual property activism
Privacy organizations
Radio-frequency identification
Civil liberties advocacy groups
Intellectual property organizations
Political organisations based in the Republic of Ireland
Copyright law organizations
Digital rights organizations